Alexey Wilhelmina Root (née Rudolph, born 1965) is a chess player, teacher, and writer, who was the 1989 U.S. Women's Chess Champion.  She holds the title of Woman International Master, and received a Ph.D. degree from UCLA.

Root is Senior Lecturer in Interdisciplinary Studies at the University of Texas at Dallas, and has written seven books on the relationship between chess and education.

Bibliography

References

Sources

External links
Monroi.com Dr. Root's blog

1965 births
Living people
American chess players
Chess Woman International Masters
American sportswomen
21st-century American women